Arunima Ghosh is an Indian Bengali film and television actress.

Filmography 
 Surya (2004)
 Ek Mutho Chabi (2005)
 Sangram (2005)
 Probhu Nosto Hoye Jai (2007)
 Hochheta Ki (2008)
 Apon Shatru (2011)
 Love Birds (2011)
 Mone Mone Bhalobasa (2011)
 Chaal - The Games Begins (2012)
 Elar Char Adhyay (2012)
 Ami Achhi Sei Je Tomar (2012) Unreleased
 Bhroon (2012) Unreleased*
 Blackmail (2012 film) (2012)
 Nayika Sangbad(2013)(2013)
 Bharate (2014)
 Banku Babu (2014)
 Aamar Aami (2014)
 Ek Phaali Rodh (2014)
 Abby Sen (2015)
 Bonku Babu (2015)
 Kiriti O Kalo Bhromor (2016)
 Thammar Boyfriend (2016)
 Eagoler Chokh(2016)
 Aschhe Abar Shabor (2017)
 Rong Beronger Khori (2017)
 Nilacholey Kiriti (2018)
 Aranyadeb (2018)
 Sotoroi September (2019)
 Shororipu 2: Jotugriho (2021)
 Maayakumari (2022)
 Iskaboner Bibi (2022)
 Lady Chatterjee (2022)
 Kirton (2022)

Television 
 Sholo Aana
 Khela as Indira / Indu (later replaced by Parno Mitra)

References 

Living people
Year of birth missing (living people)
21st-century Indian actresses
Actresses in Bengali cinema
Bengali people
Indian film actresses